From January 29 to June 4, 1996, voters of the Republican Party chose its nominee for president in the 1996 United States presidential election. Senator Bob Dole of Kansas, the former Senate majority leader, was selected as the nominee through a series of primary elections and caucuses culminating in the 1996 Republican National Convention held from August 12 to 15, 1996, in San Diego, California; Dole resigned from the Senate in June 1996 once he became the presumptive nominee to concentrate on his presidential campaign.

Background
Following the 1994 midterm elections, many prominent candidates entered what would be a crowded field.  This was expected as Democratic President Bill Clinton was unpopular in his first two years in office, eventually leading to the Republican Revolution.  However, as Clinton became increasingly popular in his third year in office, several withdrew from the race or decided not to run. Former U.S. Army Gen. Colin L. Powell was widely courted as a potential Republican nominee. However, on November 8, 1995, Powell announced that he would not seek the nomination. Former Secretary of Defense and future Vice President of the United States Dick Cheney was touted by many as a possible candidate for the presidency, but he declared his intentions not to run in early 1995. Then-Texas Governor George W. Bush was also urged by some party leaders to seek the Republican Party nomination, but opted against doing so.

Primary race overview
Going into the 1996 primary contest, Senate Majority Leader Bob Dole was widely seen as the front runner. Dole had significant name recognition, as he was a two time presidential candidate – in 1980 and 1988, and Republican vice-presidential nominee in 1976. He was expected to win the nomination against underdog candidates such as the more conservative U.S. Senator Phil Gramm of Texas and more centrist U.S. Senator Arlen Specter of Pennsylvania. The fragmented field of candidates, which also included journalist and 1992 presidential candidate Pat Buchanan and magazine publisher Steve Forbes, debated issues such as a flat tax and other tax cut proposals, and a return to supply-side economic policies popularized by Ronald Reagan. Former Governor of Tennessee Lamar Alexander had promising showings in the early Iowa and New Hampshire primaries—finishing third in both contests behind only Dole and Buchanan—but his support dropped off in later primaries and he ultimately failed to win any state's delegates. (see "1996 Republican primary and caucus results" table below). Alan Keyes, who served as Reagan's Ambassador to the United Nations Economic and Social Council and Assistant Secretary of State for International Organization Affairs, was notable for being the only African American candidate in the race, but he ultimately failed to garner much support. More attention was drawn to the race by the budget stalemate in 1995 between the Congress and the President, which caused temporary shutdowns and slowdowns in many areas of federal government service.

On January 29, Buchanan won a non-binding straw poll in Alaska. Most pundits dismissed Buchanan's showing as insignificant. On February 6, Buchanan won the Louisiana caucus. Buchanan and Gramm had made several trips to the state to campaign. Gramm was expected to win, due to being from neighboring Texas and having the support of many of the Louisiana party regulars.

The candidates met in Des Moines for a Presidential Candidates Forum. Dole won the Iowa Caucus with 26% of the vote, a considerably smaller margin of victory than was expected.

Gramm's poor showing in Louisiana plus placing 5th in Iowa's caucuses resulted in his withdrawal from the contest on the Sunday before the New Hampshire primary.

In the New Hampshire Primary, Buchanan recorded a surprising victory over Dole, who finished in second place.

After disappointing showings in Iowa and New Hampshire, Steve Forbes bounced back in the primaries in Delaware and Arizona. Forbes, along with Alan Keyes, were the only two candidates for the Republican nomination who campaigned in Delaware (According to R.W. Apple writing for The New York Times, "People in Delaware began calling their primary the Rodney Dangerfield election – it couldn't get any respect. That angered many local residents, like a woman at a Wilmington polling place this evening, who said that the New Hampshire officials who twisted the candidates' arms [into not coming to Delaware to campaign while the New Hampshire primary was ongoing] had ‘acted like little kids.’") giving Forbes an easy victory in the small state. "This state is the tax-cutting capital of the country and Steve Forbes got his tax-cutting message across" former Delaware Governor Pete du Pont said following the announcement of Forbes's victory. The bigger triumph for the Forbes campaign was in Arizona. Buchanan campaigned vigorously in Arizona in hopes of securing a crucial victory over Dole, with Buchanan even donning a cowboy costume while on the campaign trail. Faulty polling by the Dole campaign lured Dole into a false sense of security, making Dole think that the state would be an easy victory for him and he would not have to spend much time campaigning in Arizona. After the votes were counted, Buchanan finished a devastating third place, Dole was the runner-up, and Forbes pulled off a shocking, come-from-behind victory. Exit polls showed that Forbes's support came from those who voted for third-party candidate Ross Perot back in 1992, as well as from the large number of voters who cited "taxes" as the most important issue of the race and those who viewed Buchanan as too "extreme" and Dole as too moderate and "mainstream". Forbes would quickly lose the momentum he built up in Delaware and Arizona, but these back-to-back victories convinced many that Forbes was a serious contender.

Buchanan's and Forbes's early victories put Dole's expected front runner status in doubt during the formative months of the primary season. However Dole won every subsequent primary after including North and South Dakota; this eventually gave him enough delegate commitments to claim status as the GOP presidential presumptive nominee.

Having collected only 21 percent of the total votes in Republican primaries and won four states, Buchanan suspended his campaign in March. He declared however that, if Dole were to choose a pro-choice running mate, he would run as the US Taxpayers Party (now Constitution Party) candidate. Forbes also withdrew in March having won only two states.

Dole resigned his Senate seat on June 11 to focus more intently on his presidential campaign. After becoming the nominee, Dole selected the former secretary of housing and urban development of the Bush administration, Jack Kemp, as his running mate.

Candidates

Nominee

Withdrew during convention

Withdrew during primaries

Withdrew before primary elections

Other Minor Candidates

Formed exploratory committee but did not run
 Fmr. Vice President Dan Quayle of Indiana

Declined to run
 Howard Baker, former Senate Majority Leader from Tennessee
 James Baker, former Secretary of State
 Bill Bennett, former Secretary of Education
George H.W. Bush, former President of the United States
 George W. Bush, Governor of Texas
 Carroll Campbell, former Governor of South Carolina
 Dick Cheney, former Secretary of Defense
 Pete du Pont, former Governor of Delaware
 John Engler, Governor of Michigan
 Newt Gingrich, Speaker of the United States House of Representatives
 Tom Kean, former Governor of New Jersey
 Lynn Morley Martin, former Secretary of Labor
 John McCain, Senator from Arizona
 Oliver North, Retired United States Marine Corps Colonel
 Colin Powell, Retired Chairman of the Joint Chiefs of Staff
 Pat Robertson, televangelist
 Warren Rudman, former Senator from New Hampshire
 Donald Rumsfeld, former Secretary of Defense
 Tommy Thompson, Governor of Wisconsin
 Bill Weld, Governor of Massachusetts
 Christine Todd Whitman, Governor of New Jersey
 Donald Trump, businessman

Results

Nationwide
Convention tally:
 Bob Dole 1,928
 Pat Buchanan 43
 Steve Forbes 2
 Alan Keyes 1
 Robert Bork 1

Notable endorsements
Bob Dole
 Former Senator and 1964 Presidential nominee Barry Goldwater of Arizona
 Governor George W. Bush of Texas
 Senator Bill Roth of Delaware
 Senator Alan Simpson of Wyoming
 Senator Al D'Amato of New York
 Former Governor Pete du Pont of Delaware
 Former Governor George Wallace of Alabama (Democrat)

Pat Buchanan
 Governor Mike Foster of Louisiana
 State Senator Dick Mountjoy of California
 Former U.S. National Security Advisor Richard Allen
 Former Governor Evan Mecham of Arizona

Steve Forbes
 Former Congressman and HUD Secretary Jack Kemp of New York
 Former Senator Gordon Humphrey of New Hampshire
 U.S. Rep. Frank Cremeans of Ohio.
 U.S. Rep. Bob Franks of New Jersey.

Lamar Alexander
 Former Governor Tom Kean of New Jersey
 Former Secretary of Education Bill Bennett

Phil Gramm
 Senator John McCain of Arizona
 Senator Kay Bailey Hutchison of Texas

Pete Wilson
 Governor Bill Weld of Massachusetts
 Perot's 1992 running-mate and retired admiral James Stockdale of Illinois

Convention and vice presidential selection 
The delegates at the Republican National Convention formally nominated Dole on August 15, 1996, as the GOP presidential candidate for the general election. Dole was the oldest first-time presidential nominee at the age of 73 years, 1 month (Ronald Reagan was 73 years, 6 months in 1984, for his second presidential nomination).

Former Congressman and Cabinet secretary Jack Kemp was nominated by acclamation as Dole's running mate the following day. Republican Party of Texas convention delegates informally nominated Alan Keyes as their preference for Vice President.

Other politicians mentioned as possible GOP V.P. nominees before Kemp was selected included:

See also
 1996 Democratic Party presidential primaries

References

External links 
WIS-TV coverage, Bob Dole wins South Carolina Republican Primary - C-Span. March 2, 1996